Raymond Leslie Buell (1896–1946) was an American social scientist. He was an instructor at Harvard University until 1927 when he became research director at the Foreign Policy Association. He later became president of the Foreign Policy Association. He influenced the work of Ralph Bunche.

He authored the influential 1925 textbook International Relations. In the book, he flags nationalism as a powerful driver of international conflict, as it prompts conflict within empires and stokes tensions between states about borders. He argues that imperialism, which he described as "evil", provokes conflict between imperial powers and between empires and the groups that the empires tries to conquer and subjugate. He challenged notions that pure races existed and that one race was superior to other races, as well as argued that modern nations were composed of multiple races. He criticized economic nationalism and argued for free trade treaties. He opposed the U.S. policy of excluding Asians from immigration and citizenship.

He authored The Native Question in Africa, which was a comparative study of colonial rule. Buell argues in the book for retaining native tribal institutions in Africa. He opposed U.S. isolationism in the years leading up to World War II. He authored the book Isolated America in 1940.

Buell ran for Congress in 1942, losing to Allen T. Treadway in an election for Massachusetts's first congressional district.

Early life and education 
Buell was born in Chicago. His father was a minister at the Presbyterian Church. He studied at Occidental College. He wrote his 1920 book Contemporary French Politics while a student at the University of Grenoble. He earned a masters and a PhD from Princeton University.

He served in the American Expeditionary Force during World War I.

External links 

 The Raymond Leslie Buell paper collection at the Library of Congress

References 

International relations scholars
American political scientists
Occidental College alumni
Princeton University alumni
Grenoble Alpes University alumni